is a Japanese footballer who plays for Fukuyama City FC.

Club statistics
Updated to 23 February 2020.

References

External links

Profile at Gainare Tottori
Profile at Fukuyama City FC

1998 births
Living people
Association football people from Tottori Prefecture
Japanese footballers
J3 League players
Japan Football League players
Gainare Tottori players
Matsue City FC players
Association football midfielders